Pierre Bordier (born 21 June 1945) is a member of the Senate of France, representing the Yonne department. He is a member of the Union for a Popular Movement.

References
Page on the Senate website 

1945 births
Living people
Union for a Popular Movement politicians
French Senators of the Fifth Republic
Senators of Yonne
Place of birth missing (living people)